The 2007–08 Houston Rockets season was their 41st season in the National Basketball Association and 37th in Houston. The Rockets won at least 50 games for the second straight season and made the playoffs also on the back of a 22-game winning streak, the fourth longest in the history of the NBA. The Houston Rockets came into the 2007–2008 playoffs without Yao Ming, who was still injured. This injury contributed to the Rockets' elimination by the Utah Jazz in the first round (2–4). This was the second consecutive season where the Rockets had their season ended by the Jazz. The team brought back Steve Francis, but his return was short-lived as he was active for only 10 games, starting 3 of them. It would be his last season in the NBA.

Key dates prior to the start of the season:

The 2007 NBA draft took place in New York City on 28 June.
The free agency period began in July.

Draft picks
Houston's selections from the 2007 NBA draft in New York City.

In addition, Carl Landry was drafted as the 31st overall pick by the Seattle SuperSonics with the first pick in the 2nd round. He was traded to the Rockets for a future second round pick.

Roster

Regular season

Standings

Record vs. opponents

Game log

October
Record: 1–0 ; Home: 0–0 ; Road: 1–0

November
Record: 8–8; Home: 4–3; Road: 4–5

December
Record: 6–8; Home: 3–3; Road: 3–5

January
Record: 10–4; Home: 5–3; Road: 5–1

February
Record: 13–0; Home: 8–0; Road: 5–0

March
Record: 11–4; Home: 7–1; Road: 4–3

April
Record: 6–3; Home: 3–0; Road: 3–3

Green background indicates win.
Red background indicates regulation loss.
White background indicates overtime/shootout loss.

Player stats

Regular season

*Total for entire season including previous team(s)

Playoffs

Awards and records

Awards
Yao Ming, All-NBA Third Team
Tracy McGrady, All-NBA Third Team
Shane Battier, NBA All-Defensive Second Team
Luis Scola, NBA All-Rookie Team 1st Team
Carl Landry, NBA All-Rookie Team 2nd Team

Records
Starting with the 29 January 2008 win versus the Golden State Warriors, the Rockets won 22 consecutive games. The streak came to an end against the eventual champion Boston Celtics. The streak is the fourth longest winning streak in NBA history (the second longest at the time it was achieved).

Milestones

Transactions
The Rockets have been involved in the following transactions during the 2007–08 season.

Houston will begin the 2007–08 season with recently hired Rick Adelman as the team's 11th head coach.

Less than a week later, Scola signed with the Rockets.
On 20 July guard Steve Francis signed a 2-year deal with the Rockets, after he accepted a buyout of the last two seasons of his contract, worth roughly $30 million from the Portland Trail Blazers. He is expected to compete for a starting job with Mike James and Rafer Alston

Trades

On 14 June, the Rockets traded Juwan Howard to the Minnesota Timberwolves for Mike James and Justin Reed.

On 12 July guard Vassilis Spanoulis was traded to the San Antonio Spurs along with the rights for the 2009 second-round draft pick, for center Jackie Butler and the rights to Luis Scola a 2002 second-round draft pick, yet to play in the NBA. 24 Hours after this deal was made, Scola came to a "Basic Agreement" which could see him playing for the Rockets next season.

Free agents

Court Redesign

On 7 September, it was announced that the Rockets will debut a new court design for the 2007–08 season. The court design includes a lighter varnished wood inside the three point area, similar to the Seattle SuperSonics, while the rest are dark varnished wood. The color red will remain on the Rockets logo, and the script. This court design is similar to the Cleveland Cavaliers, New Orleans Hornets, Phoenix Suns, and Portland Trail Blazers in which most of the hardwood is exposed.

Playoffs

|- align="center" bgcolor="#ffcccc"
| 1 || 19 April || Utah || L 82–93 || Shane Battier (22) || Luis Scola (13) || Tracy McGrady (7) ||Toyota Center18,213 || 0–1
|- align="center" bgcolor="#ffcccc"
| 2 || 21 April || Utah || L 84–90 || Tracy McGrady (23) || Tracy McGrady (13) || Tracy McGrady (9) ||Toyota Center18,158 || 0–2
|- align="center" bgcolor="#ccffcc"
| 3 || 24 April || @ Utah || W 94–92 || Tracy McGrady (27) || Carl Landry (11) || Tracy McGrady (7) ||EnergySolutions Arena19,911 || 1–2
|- align="center" bgcolor="#ffcccc"
| 4 || 26 April || @ Utah || L 82–86 || Tracy McGrady (23) || Tracy McGrady (10) || Tracy McGrady (8) ||EnergySolutions Arena19,911 || 1–3
|- align="center" bgcolor="#ccffcc"
| 5 || 29 April || Utah || W 95–69 || Tracy McGrady (29) || Luis Scola (12) || Rafer Alston (6) ||Toyota Center18,269 || 2–3
|- align="center" bgcolor="#ffcccc"
| 6 || 2 May || @ Utah || L 91–113 || Tracy McGrady (40) || Tracy McGrady (10) || Tracy McGrady (5) ||EnergySolutions Arena19,911 || 2–4
|-

See also
2007–08 NBA season

References

External links
Official Rockets website

Houston Rockets seasons
2007–08 NBA season by team